The Trani Cup is a tennis tournament held in Trani, Italy since 2002. The event is part of the ATP Challenger Tour and is played on outdoor red clay courts.

Past finals

Singles

Doubles

External links 
ITF search

 
ATP Challenger Tour
Clay court tennis tournaments
Tennis tournaments in Italy